Nuestra is the debut studio album of the Venezuelan rock band La Vida Bohème, released in August 2010. Recorded and produced by Rudy Pagliuca, it is a free download on the website of the record label All of the Above.

The album was nominated for "Best Latin Pop, Rock or Urban Album" in the 54th Grammy Awards. The two singles from this album are "Radio Capital" and "Danz!".

Background and recording 

The album was recorded in Caracas in 2009, on fairly independent terms. Guitarist Daniel De Sousa happened to be studying engineering at the time, and took on designing a distortion pedal that was used on the album. The synths were designed/programmed by fellow Venezuelan artist Arca, then known as Nuuro.

In popular culture 

The song "El Buen Salvaje" is included in the video game FIFA 12, winning the MTV Game Awards 2012 for "Best song in a video game".

"Radio Capital" is present in the Rockstar's video game Grand Theft Auto V, in which it is played on the East Los FM station.

Track listing

Personnel 

 Henry D'Arthenay: Vocals, rhythm guitar, keyboards, synthesizer
 Daniel de Sousa: Lead guitar, vocals, drums, cowbell
 Rafael Pérez Medina: Bass, Backing vocals
 Sebastián Ayala: Drums, backing vocals

References

La Vida Bohème albums
2010 debut albums